The men's 3000 metres steeplechase event at the 1994 European Athletics Championships was held in Helsinki, Finland, at Helsinki Olympic Stadium on 9 and 12 August 1994.

Medalists

Results

Final
12 August

Heats
9 August

Heat 1

Heat 2

Participation
According to an unofficial count, 21 athletes from 14 countries participated in the event.

 (1)
 (1)
 (1)
 (1)
 (1)
 (2)
 (3)
 (1)
 (1)
 (1)
 (1)
 (3)
 (1)
 (3)

References

3000 metres steeplechase
Steeplechase at the European Athletics Championships